The Hekou Formation is a Cretaceous geologic formation in China. Pterosaur fossils have been recovered from the formation. It is a unit of the Guifeng Group and dates to the Late Cretaceous (Coniacian-early Campanian). An indeterminate Hadrosaurid is known from the formation.

See also

 List of pterosaur-bearing stratigraphic units

References

Upper Cretaceous Series of Asia
Maastrichtian Stage